Pseudophacidium is a genus of fungi within the Ascodichaenaceae family.

References

External links
Index Fungorum

Leotiomycetes
Taxa named by Petter Adolf Karsten